The Tingitan Peninsula, also known as the Tangier Peninsula, is a small peninsula in northwest Africa, which together with the southernmost part of mainland Spain (Iberian Peninsula), forms the Strait of Gibraltar, the Atlantic Ocean boundary with the Mediterranean Sea. The principal cities are Tangier, Tétouan and Ceuta. Administratively, the peninsula belongs to the Moroccan prefectures of Tanger-Assilah, Fahs-Anjra, M'Diq-Fnideq and Tetouan, and the Spanish autonomous city of Ceuta. Historically it belonged to the province of Mauretania Tingitana.

References

Landforms of Morocco
Geography of Tanger-Tetouan-Al Hoceima
Peninsulas of Africa